Elections to Penwith District Council were held on 2 May 2002.  One third of the council was up for election and the council stayed under no overall control. Overall turnout was 40.3%

After the election, the composition of the council was
Independent 11
Conservative 10
Liberal Democrat 9
Labour 3
Others 1

Results

One Labour and one Mebyon Kernow candidate were elected unopposed

By ward

References

2002 Penwith election result
Turnout figures
 Ward results

2002 English local elections
2002
2000s in Cornwall